Jigme Wangchuk is a Bhutanese politician who is the current Deputy Chairman of the National Council of Bhutan. He has been a member of the National Council of Bhutan, since May 2018. Previously, he was a member of the National Council of Bhutan from 2008 to 2013 and again from 2013 to 2018.

He was elected as Deputy Chairman of the National Council of Bhutan. He received 13 votes out of total 25 votes cast and defeated Ugyen Namgay.

References 

Members of the National Council (Bhutan)
1980 births
Living people